Jodi No.1 is an Indian 2001 Hindi-language comedy film directed by David Dhawan. Released on 13 April 2001, the film stars Sanjay Dutt, Govinda, Anupam Kher, Twinkle Khanna and Monica Bedi. Budgeted at  the film was a commercial success, grossing  at the box office.

Plot
Jai (Sanjay Dutt) and Veeru (Govinda) are good friends and also partners in crime, thus their friendship is named Jodi No. 1.  They first gain the confidence of people and later con them.  But soon they have to run from Bombay after an encounter with a local Bhai, because they end up having a brawl with his younger brother (Rajat Bedi) and they by accident kill him in a night club. While on the run, Jai and Veeru meet Vikramjeet Singh (Aashif Sheikh), an NRI, who is on his way to work as a manager, in Goa, for Rai Bahadur (Anupam Kher), a wealthy businessman who owns a beer factory.

Jai pretends to be Vikramjeet Singh and both he and Veeru move into Rai Bahadur's house intending to befriend then rob him. However, they fall in love with Rai Bahadur's daughters (Monica Bedi and Twinkle Khanna) and in a series of hilarious scenes, save the family from Sir John (Ashish Vidyarthi). In the end, while Jai is stealing money from Rai to release Veeru from Sir John, the entire Rai clan is watching the news and find out that Jai and Veeru are not who they claim to be, but con men. In the end, Rai then lets Jai go with the money to save Veeru and all goes well and they marry the daughters of Rai.

Cast
Sanjay Dutt as Jai / Vikramjeet Singh
Govinda as Veeru / Raju Coolie
Twinkle Khanna as Tina
Monica Bedi as Rinki Rai Bahadur
Anupam Kher as Rai Bahadur
Ashish Vidyarthi as Sir John (Bhanja)
Sayaji Shinde as Thakral (Mama)
 Supriya Karnik as Shanno Bua
Aashif Sheikh as Vikramjeet Singh (NRI)
Tiku Talsania as Ranjit Singh, Vikramjeet’s father. 
Sanjay Narvekar as Bedi
Mukesh Rishi as Baburao
Shakti Kapoor as Insp. Shakti Singh (Mumbai Police)
Ajit Vachani as Raman Rai
Ashok Saraf as Ashok Rai
Anil Dhawan as Kamal Rai
Avtar Gill as Insp. Ram (Goa Police)
 Kannu Gill as Wife of Raman
Himani Shivpuri as Wife of Kamal
Shivaji Satam as Crime Branch (special appearance)
Rajat Bedi as Tiger (special appearance)
Pooja Batra as herself in Item Song Mai Mast Kudi. (special appearance)
Mushtaq Khan as D'Costa
Pramod Moutho as Rajpal
 Shashi Kiran as Banker
Arjun as Monty, Sir John's brother.
Vashu Bhagnani as Hasina

Music

The music is composed by Anand Raaj Anand and Himesh Reshammiya, the lyrics were written by Dev Kohli and Sudhakar Sharma.

Reception
Writing for Rediff.com, Nidhi Taparia called the film "as humorous as canned laughter" and opined that both Khanna and Bedi "up the glam factor" but "might as well not have acted in the film". She felt that Ashish Vidyarthi, Sayaji Shinde, Shakti Kapoor and Anupam Kher are "wasted" in the film. Taran Adarsh wrote in his 2-star review for Bollywood Hungama, that the film "will settle to the average category" and if it belonged to anybody it was Govinda. He added that Khanna "oozes oomph" and Bedi added "glamour to the proceedings."

According to Box Office India the film had an excellent opening. Altogether it made Rs.28 Crores and was declared a "Hit" by Box Office India. It was also the fifth highest-grossing film of the year. (Bollywood films of 2001).

Awards
 Nominated: Filmfare Award for Best Performance in a Comic Role - Govinda
 Winner: IIFA Award for Best Performance in a Comic Role - Govinda

References

External links
 

 Indian buddy films
2000s Hindi-language films
2001 films
Indian crime comedy films
Films directed by David Dhawan
Films scored by Himesh Reshammiya
Films scored by Anand Raj Anand
Indian comedy films
Films set in Mumbai
Films set in Goa